The canton of La Côte Sableuse is an administrative division of the Pyrénées-Orientales department, in southern France. It was created at the French canton reorganisation which came into effect in March 2015. Its seat is in Canet-en-Roussillon.

It consists of the following communes: 
Canet-en-Roussillon 
Saint-Cyprien
Saint-Nazaire
Saleilles

References

Cantons of Pyrénées-Orientales